was a Japanese dermatologist and urologist.

Keratosis follicularis squamosa Dohi
Keratosis follicularis squamosa Dohi is a kind of follicular keratosis, in which scales appear elevated from skin surface reminding one of the floating leaves of the lotus.

Moulage
He learned the technique of moulage (wax modeling) in Vienna and introduced its practice to Japan. This technique had greatly contributed to medical education, however, the use of color film in recording skin manifestations made moulage obsolete.

References

Japanese dermatologists
Japanese urologists